Patrick Edward Peoples (born 21 February 1969) is a New Zealand rower.

Peoples was born in 1969 in Greymouth, New Zealand. He represented New Zealand at the 1992 Summer Olympics. He is listed as New Zealand Olympian athlete number 658 by the New Zealand Olympic Committee.

Peoples has a civil engineering degree from the University of Canterbury. He worked for Fulton Hogan, first in Christchurch and then in the Waikato. He is self-employed and owns Schick Group of Companies that includes Schick Civil Construction and has built up an organization with over 400 staff.

References

1969 births
Living people
New Zealand businesspeople
New Zealand civil engineers
New Zealand male rowers
Olympic rowers of New Zealand
Rowers at the 1992 Summer Olympics
Sportspeople from Greymouth
Sportspeople from Hamilton, New Zealand
University of Canterbury alumni